A Web is a term used in the Converting Industry that refers to continuous rolls of thin, flat materials like paper, film and plastic.  Web guiding systems use a sensor to monitor the position of a web as it enters a production process for lateral tracking.  Each type of web guide sensor has an actuator to shift the running web mechanically back on course whenever the sensor detects movement away from the set path.  Actuators may be pneumatic or hydraulic cylinders, or some kind of electromechanical device. Because the web may be fragile — particularly at its edge — non-contact sensors are used.  

Sensors developed for Web Guiding applications in the Converting Industry may be pneumatic, photoelectric, ultrasonic, or infrared.  The system’s controls must process the output signals from the sensors in to a form that can drive an actuator.  Many controls today are electronic, typically using an amplifier to convert signals from the sensor, then commanding a special servo motor incorporating a lead or ball screw for guiding actuation.  Some electromechanical guiding systems also utilize computers.   

Pneumatic web guide systems are typically easier to install, operate and are less expensive than more complex hydraulic and electronic systems. Pneumatic servo controllers are considered explosion-proof, especially in dusty or contaminated environments.

Material-handling equipment